The College View is Dublin City University’s only student newspaper, independently run voluntarily by students affiliated to DCU's Journalism Society.
The newspaper was first published in 1999 after changing its name from The Bullsheet, its predecessor.

The College View has seven sections – News, Opinions and Analysis, Irish, Features, Sport and our Arts and Lifestyle magazine, The HYPE. The sections cover everything from DCU student issues to national student issues, humour and satire to life through the eyes of students, as well as extensive sports coverage and analysis. The Irish section is written and edited by students studying Journalism through Irish in DCU.

The College View is published fortnightly on Wednesday, with six issues per semester and is circulated among 12,000 students as well as DCU lecturers and staff.

History
The College View was founded in 1999, and went under the name of The Bullsheet, a reference to the other DCU publication An Tarbh, for a while. The newspaper has changed layout several times during its history. It has always been tabloid-size. In January 2022 The College View affiliated with the DCU Media Production Society, after the liquidation of the Journalism Society.

Administration
The newspaper is run entirely voluntarily and is affiliated to the DCU Media Production Society. In addition to advertising revenue, The College View is funded by a grant from the Society Life Committee, however the newspaper remains fully independent.

Supplements
The HYPE is the arts and lifestyle supplement of The College View, and is run as 16-page supplement within the newspaper. It was previously named the Suss until the 2017/18 academic year. It was previously named Flux where it won magazine of the year at the 2010  Student Media Awards. The arts supplement was previously named The Attic, having been renamed in 2009/10.

The Look was a fashion supplement produced in conjunction with the DCU Style Society in the past; however, is now published independently.

The Bill O'Herlihy Cup

The Bill O'Herlihy Cup is an annual five-a-side football match held every year between The College View and DCUfm.

The game is a yearly tradition each April at Dublin City University between the rival student newspaper and radio station.

Founded in 2010, the game is named after broadcaster and journalist Bill O'Herlihy.

The Cork native covered numerous World Cups, European Championships and Olympic Games for RTÉ and is considered one of the greatest-ever Irish sports broadcasters. O'Herlihy died in May 2015.

The Bill O'Herlihy Cup was named in his honour. O'Herlihy presented the trophy on one occasion during a visit to Dublin City University and was interviewed by DCUfm about his career in media and broadcasting afterwards.

Winners:

2021: Postponed

2020: Postponed

2019: The College View

2018: DCUfm

2017: The College View

2016: The College View

2015: DCUfm

2014: DCUfm

2013: DCUfm

2012: The College View

2011: The College View

2010: DCUfm

Awards

 National Student Media Awards
Journalist of the Year 2019 - Gabija Gataveckaite
Features Writer News and Current Affairs 2019 - Ciara O'Loughlin
RSA Award for Journalism on Road Safety 2019 - Cait Caden
Editor of the Year 2018 - Shauna Bowers
SFI Science Writer of the Year 2018 - Shauna Bowers
Arts & Pop culture Feature Writer of the Year 2018 - Colin Gannon
Journalist of the Year (National Press) 2018 - Aaron Gallagher
Irish Journalist of the Year Iriseoireacht trí Ghaeilge (Scríofa) 2016 - Cal Ó Donnabháin
Journalist of the Year (National Press) 2013 - Sarah Bermingham
People's Choice Award 2012 - Under editor Catherine Dennehy.
Irish Journalist of the Year 2013 Iriseoireacht trí Ghaeilge (Scríofa) - Derek O'Brien
Irish Journalist of the Year 2012 Iriseoireacht trí Ghaeilge (Scríofa) - Frances Mulraney'
Magazine of the Year 2010(Flux) - Samuel Hamilton
News Features Writer of the Year 2010 - Stephen Mangan
Arts Features Writer of the Year 2010 - Patrick Kavanagh
Sports Writer of the Year 2010 - Stephen Mangan
Journalist of the Year 2010 - Samuel Hamilton
Sports Writer of the Year 2009 - Stephen Mangan
Journalist of the Year 2009 - Michael McHale

DCU Hybrid Awards
Website of the Year 2018 - thecollegeview.com
Layout and Design of the Year 2018 - Daniel Troy and Amanda Ward
Website of the Year 2017 - thecollegeview.com
Publication Layout of the Year 2017 - Scout Mitchell and Hannah Kelly
Arts/Features Journalist of the Year 2017 - Orla O'Driscoll
News/Current Affairs Journalist of the Year 2017 - Aaron Gallagher
News/Current Affairs Journalist of the Year 2016 - Hayley Halpin
Arts/Features Journalist of the Year 2016 - Scout Mitchell
Publication Layout of the Year 2014 - Marie Lecoq and Rachel McLaughlin (The College View)
Sports Journalist of the Year 2014 - Ruaidhrí Croke 
 Arts/Features Journalist of the Year 2014 - Aoife Bennett
Website of The Year 2013 - Nicky Ryan (TheCollegeView.com)
News and Current Affairs Journalist of The Year 2013 - Sam Griffin
Journalist of The Year 2013 - Sam Griffin
Sports Journalist of The Year 2013 - Eoghan Cormican
Sports Journalist of the Year 2012 - Brendan White 
Arts/Features winner - Valerie Loftus 2012 
Irish Language Journalist of the Year 2012 - Derek O'Brien
News and Current Affairs Journalist of the Year 2012 - Sarah Doran
Journalist of the Year 2012 - Aoife Mullen 
Journalist of the Year 2011 - Niall O'Connor
Journalist of the Year 2010 - Stephen Mangan
Features Writer of the Year 2010 - Sam Matthews
Sports Writer of the Year 2010 - Michael Glennon

Notable contributors
Shauna Bowers - Journalist with The Irish Times 
Zainab Boladale - RTÉ Presenter
Hayley Halpin - News Reporter, TheJournal.ie
Aaron Gallagher - Sports Journalist, The42.ie
Catherine Devine - Journalist with Independent.ie
Katie O'Neill - Journalist with The Times (Ireland Edition)
Michael Cogley - Business Correspondent, The Sunday Independent
Ruaidhrí Croke - Sports Journalist, The Irish Times
Sean Defoe - Political Correspondent, Newstalk
Eoin Sheahan - Sports Journalist, Off The Ball
Sharron Lynskey - Radio Presenter, iRadio
Laura Colgan - Journalist, Irish Daily Star
Nicky Ryan - TheJournal.ie
Sarah McInerney - The Late Debate, RTÉ
Ian Kehoe - Editor of The Currency
Tadhg Enright - Sky News business correspondent
Ciaran Cronin (Semester 1, 2001) - Former soccer writer for The Sunday Tribune
Michael Brennan (semester 2, 2001) - Deputy Political Editor for The Irish Independent
Paul O'Flynn (2002) - Sports Presenter/Video Journalist for RTÉ
Mary Regan (2002, news editor) - Political Correspondent with RTÉ
Laura Whitmore (2005/2006) - MTV UK and I'm A Celebrity host
Cathal McMahon (2005/2006, editor) - Crime Reporter with The Irish Daily Mirror
Niall O'Connor (2009/2010, news editor) - Reporter with The Herald
Samuel Hamilton (2009/2010, deputy/news editor) - showbiz reporter with the Irish Daily Mirror
Laura Slattery (2000) - Business Journalist with the Irish Times

Current editorial team (2022/2023) 
The current editorial team for the academic year 2022/2023 is as follows:

Editor-In-Chief: Matthew Joyce

Deputy Editor-In-Chief: Muiris O'Cearbhaill

News Team
 Editors: Louise Hickey & Jamil Bhaloo
 Deputies: 
Sports Team
 Editor: Rory Cassidy
 Deputies: Caoimhe Woods & Niamh Murphy
Production Team
 Production Editors:

Arts Team

 Editor: Liam Coates
 Deputies: Andrew Walsh, Erin Murphy & James O'Brien
Opinion Team
 Editor: Louise Hickey
Deputy: Jack Redmond
Lifestyle Team
 Editor: Jade McNamee
 Deputies: Abigail Cardiff
Irish Team
 Editor: Caoimhe Woods

Features Team
 Editor: Hannah Daygo
 Deputy: 
Image Team
 Editors: Kate Byrne & Hannah Daygo

Video Team
 Editors: Jade McNamee & Kate Byrne

Illustrations Team

 Editor:

Sub-Editors
 Chief Sub Editor: Sarah O'Tuama
 Deputy Sub-Editor: 

Podcast Team
 Podcast Editor: 

Social Media Team
 Social Media Editor: Rachael Dunphy

Editors

References

External links
The College View - official website
Dublin City University - official website
DCU Journalism Society  - official website

Student newspapers published in the Republic of Ireland